Cherry Bullet is a South Korean girl group formed by FNC Entertainment and managed under their sub-label FNC W. They debuted on January 21, 2019, with their first single album titled Let's Play Cherry Bullet. The group currently consists of seven members: Haeyoon, Yuju, Bora, Jiwon, Remi, Chaerin and May. Originally consisting of ten members, Mirae, Kokoro and Linlin left the group in December 2019.

History

Pre-debut
Haeyoon was previously introduced as one of the female trainees to represent FNC Entertainment on the Mnet survival show, Produce 48. She finished in 19th place and hence did not become a member of the produced girl group, Iz*One.

Bora previously was a trainee at Music K Entertainment. Both her and fellow member Yuju appeared in BTS' Love Yourself: Her highlight reel, with Yuju also making an appearance in Honeyst's "Someone to Love" music video.

Jiwon auditioned for the first season of SBS' K-pop Star with the song "Because of You" by Kelly Clarkson and later became a trainee under Starship Entertainment. In 2012 she appeared in Starship Planet's "White Love" music video.

Remi was a trainee with Avex Proworks and first appeared in the live-action segments of Pretty Rhythm: Dear My Future in 2012 as one of the Prism Mates but did not pass the audition to become an official member. She modeled for Repipi Armario at Point 65th Fashion Show's 2014 Spring Collection. Kokoro was also a student at Avex Artist Academy in Nagoya, Japan, and she was scouted by FNC Entertainment in 2016.

2018–2020: Debut with Let's Play Cherry Bullet, line-up changes and digital singles
The group's debut reality show Insider Channel Cherry Bullet premiered on November 28, 2018, on Mnet. The reality show was made to introduce the group and each of its 10 members to viewers.

Their first single album, Let's Play Cherry Bullet was released on January 21, 2019, with consisted of the lead single "Q&A", and two other songs, "Violet" and "Stick Out". They held their debut showcase on the same day at YES24 Live Hall in Gwangjin-gu, Seoul.

On May 9, 2019, it was revealed that Cherry Bullet would come back on May 22 with their second single Love Adventure with lead single  "Really Really".

On December 13, 2019, FNC announced that Mirae, Kokoro and Linlin had left the group and terminated their contracts due to personal reasons. The remaining members of Cherry Bullet would then continue as a seven-member group with no additional members, and Haeyoon would then take over as the new leader of the group.

The group released their first digital single "Hands Up" on February 11, 2020.

On August 6, 2020, Cherry Bullet made their comeback with the new digital single "Aloha Oe".

2021–present: Cherry Rush, Girls Planet 999, Cherry Wish and Cherry Dash
On January 4, 2021, it was announced that Cherry Bullet have joined the social media platform Weverse. The group released their first EP Cherry Rush and its lead single "Love So Sweet" on January 20.

On February 3, 2021, it was announced that Cherry Bullet would be managed by FNC Entertainment's new sub-label, FNC W, which is specialized for girl groups.

Bora, Jiwon and May took part in the Mnet survival show Girls Planet 999, which aired from August 6, 2021, to October 22, 2021. Jiwon was eliminated in episode 8, finishing in 16th place in K-Group. May was eliminated in episode 11, finishing in 8th place in J-Group and 24th place overall. Bora was eliminated in the final episode, placing 9th in K-Group and 15th place overall.

On March 2, 2022, Cherry Bullet released their second EP Cherry Wish and its lead single "Love In Space".

On March 7, 2023, Cherry Bullet released their third EP Cherry Dash, and its lead single "P.O.W! (Play On the World)".

Endorsements
Jiwon and Yuju were models for the Korean uniform brand Smart in 2018, alongside BTS. The members were also selected to represent the brand in 2019.

Members
Adapted from their Naver profile.

Current
 Haeyoon
 Yuju
 Bora
 Jiwon
 Remi
 Chaerin
 May

Former
 Mirae
 Kokoro
 Linlin

Timeline

Discography

Extended plays

Single albums

Singles

Videography

Music videos

Reality shows

Awards and nominations

Asia Artist Awards

|-
|rowspan="2"|2019
|rowspan="3"|Cherry Bullet
|Popularity Award (Singer)
|
|-
|Starnews Popularity Award (Female Group)
|
|-
|2021
|Female Idol Group Popularity Award
|
|}

Genie Music Awards

|-
|rowspan="4"|2019
|rowspan="4"|Cherry Bullet
|The Top Artist
|
|-
|The Female New Artist
|
|-
|Genie Music Popularity Award
|
|-
|Global Popularity Award
|
|}

Melon Music Awards

|-
|2019
|Cherry Bullet
|Best New Artist Award
|
|}

Mnet Asian Music Awards

|-
|rowspan="4"|2019
|rowspan="4"|Cherry Bullet
|Artist of the Year
|
|-
|Best New Female Artist
|
|-
|Worldwide Fans' Choice Top 10
|
|-
|2019 Qoo10 Favorite Female Artist
|
|}

Seoul Music Awards

|-
|rowspan="3"|2020
|rowspan="3"|Cherry Bullet
|Rookie of the Year
|
|-
|Popularity Award
|
|-
|Hallyu Special Award
|
|}

Notes

References

External links

 

2019 establishments in South Korea
South Korean girl groups
K-pop music groups
Musical groups established in 2019
South Korean pop music groups
South Korean dance music groups
Musical groups from Seoul
FNC Entertainment artists